Arthur Gilbert Bull MRCS LRCP (1890–15 March 1963), also known as A.G. Bull, was an England rugby international and Captain of Northampton Saints in 1924.

Life
Arthur Gilbert Bull was born in Olney, Buckinghamshire in 1890.  He was baptised on 13 July 1890 at Hardingstone in the County of Northamptonshire, the son of Arthur Bull of Leicestershire and Annie Bull of Inverness-shire. He was educated at Bedford Modern School.

Bull’s only game for England was against Wales at Twickenham on 17 January 1914. Bull played for Leicester Tigers in the 1918–1919 season following the end of the First World War.  He later played club rugby for Northampton Saints and was captain of the team in 1924.  After ending his career as a rugby player he became the manager of Northampton Saints.

Bull trained as a doctor and was a Member of the Royal College of Surgeons and the Royal College of Physicians. He died in Chandler's Ford, Hampshire on 15 March 1963.

References

1890 births
1963 deaths
People educated at Bedford Modern School
British Army personnel of World War I
England international rugby union players
Northampton Saints players
Leicester Tigers players
Rugby union players from Buckinghamshire
Rugby union flankers